John O'Quinn Field at TDECU Stadium is an American football stadium on the campus of the University of Houston. The stadium serves as the home of the Houston Cougars football team, which represents the University of Houston in collegiate football and the Houston Roughnecks of the XFL.

TDECU Stadium was built on the former site of Robertson Stadium, which was the intermittent home of the school's football program since 1946. Its official name is derived from Texas Dow Employees Credit Union (TDECU), the largest credit union in Houston, which purchased its naming rights in what was then the largest-ever naming rights deal for a college football stadium.

Plans for a new or renovated football venue were developed by the university's athletics department and their contractors as early as 2010. Demolition of Robertson Stadium began on December 3, 2012, and the official groundbreaking for the new stadium was celebrated on February 8, 2013. TDECU Stadium cost US$128 million to build. The University of Houston opened the new stadium on Friday, August 29, 2014 in a contest with UTSA.

History

Planning and funding

Feasibility study
On February 10, 2010, Houston athletics director Mack Rhoades announced that the University of Houston had hired consultant JMI Sports and engineering/architectural design firm AECOM to conduct a feasibility study regarding possible renovations or reconstruction of Houston's Robertson Stadium and Hofheinz Pavilion. Based on the study, Houston officials announced on June 10, 2010, their intention to raze Robertson Stadium in preparation for a new stadium to be built on the same location and to perform major renovations on Hofheinz Pavilion.  The plan included a new football stadium with an initial capacity of 40,000 seats with expandability to 60,000. At an estimated $120 million cost, Houston athletics also announced the start of a fundraising drive.

Lead gift
On August 18, 2011, the University of Houston announced that they had received the largest single donation for the stadium when co-CEOs and co-founders of Austin-based Data Foundry, Ron and Carolyn Yokubaitis donated US$10 million to the project. Ron Yokubaitis is an alumnus of the University of Houston and former Cougar football player. Houston officials also reported that $60 million had been raised for the stadium, whereas approximately $80–$85 million was needed to break ground on construction.

Student stadium fee
On November 14, 2011, the Student Fees Advisory Committee (SFAC), a joint student-faculty committee which advises university administration about compulsory student fees, recommended an increase of student fees to specifically construct, maintain, and operate athletic facilities.  The committee also recommended that input from the student body was necessary, and that this would be appropriate through a student referendum made possible by future legislation in the Student Government Association (SGA).

On November 30, 2011, Student Senator Jared Gogets introduced the bill SGAR48007 to the Senate in SGA authorizing a referendum for a student service fee increase to be voted on by students as advised by the SFAC two weeks prior.  The bill was passed, and a referendum was then organized.

From January 31 to February 1, 2012, UH students voted on a referendum to allow a fee increase to help fund stadium projects.  After the votes were tallied, a total of 7,334 students (73.9%) voted in favor of the fee increase, while 2,589 students (26.1%) voted against it.  The voter turnout of the student body was the largest in the history of the university.

Request for proposal
Following the conclusion of the 2011 regular football season, the Big East Conference invited Houston to become a full member. (By the time Houston joined in 2013, the conference had split in two along football lines, with Houston joining the football-sponsoring legal successor now known as the American Athletic Conference.) During the University of Houston's official announcement of its acceptance to the athletic conference on December 9, 2011, Chairwoman of the University of Houston System Board of Regents Nelda Luce Blair announced that the university would  issue a request for qualifications (RFQ) to the public in order to obtain new architectural plans.  She also noted that ground-breaking was expected to occur in October 2012.

The ground-breaking date was later revised to December 2012 when the RFQ was officially presented to the public on January 9, 2012.  It was also revealed that the planned completion date would be in July 2014 in time for the 2014 football season.

Site selection
During a regularly-scheduled meeting by the University of Houston System Board of Regents on February 15, 2012, the board was expected to vote on approval for the stadium's construction, but instead elected to table the matter in order to re-evaluate the proposed stadium's site until their next meeting.  Other possible sites such as the on-campus intramural fields directly adjacent to Interstate 45 and an undeveloped area of campus—adjacent to MacGregor Park—were candidates.  On March 28, 2012, the Board of Regents officially decided to continue with the original plan of construction on the Robertson Stadium site, and cited added costs and difficulty in future expansion as reason for not using the alternate sites.

Architects named
On June 12, 2012, the University of Houston announced that they had hired PageSoutherlandPage and DLR Group as joint architects for the facility. The university also updated its estimated cost to $105 million from the previous $120 million estimate from the 2010 feasibility study.

Board of Regents approval
University of Houston System's Board of Regents approved an $85 million funding package on August 15, 2012 to finance the first phase of stadium construction.  At that time, the university's athletics department noted that they were on-schedule to gather the rest of the funds as necessary for the construction schedule, and the board of regents later approved the final $20 million financing package for the stadium at its May 14, 2013 meeting.  At their August 15, 2013 meeting, the UH System Board of Regents approved Phase III funding for the football stadium in the amount of $15 million, bringing the total cost of the stadium back to $120 million.

Naming Rights
Reports surfaced on July 7, 2014 that Texas Dow Employees Credit Union (TDECU) had purchased the naming rights to the stadium.  TDECU is the largest credit union in the Houston area.  On July 8, 2014, the University of Houston held a joint press conference with TDECU to formally announce the partnership.  TDECU agreed to pay the school $15 million over 10 years for the venue to be called "TDECU Stadium." In addition to naming rights, TDECU enjoys a 50-yard line suite, and their members and employees receive ticket discounts.  Further, TDECU opened a branch office in the University Center on campus.  The parties have an option to extend the agreement for five additional years at $7.5 million.

Design and construction
Major demolition of Robertson Stadium, Houston's previous home, officially began on December 10, 2012, however the south end zone was removed by December 6. On December 19, 2012, the Houston athletics department released architectural renderings of the stadium to the public.  In conjunction with a press conference, a new website for the stadium was launched.

DLR Group and Page, formerly known as PageSoutherlandPage, jointly designed the stadium to match the adjacent buildings including the new stadium parking garage that had been constructed earlier during the year, but also wanted a unique architectural design for the project.  The stadium was designed with a "corrugated metal exterior skin" that allows for optimal air flow and natural lighting.  A sun shade study was conducted to determine the best orientation for the new stadium.  As a result, unlike the previous stadium, the orientation of the new stadium was designed to be in an "East-West" configuration to provide for greater comfort for fans and athletes.  Simultaneously, the orientation allows for a maximized view of the Houston skyline.  The stadium site, at its on-campus location, is less than three miles from  Downtown Houston.

The stadium is an open concourse design with a complete lower bowl built twenty five feet below grade and seating 20,000 fans on top of the field.  The premium suites, loge boxes and club level are built on the concourse level in the middle of the home stands instead of on top of the grandstand like many college stadiums.  As a result, these premium seats are as close to the field as any stadium in college football.

On February 8, 2013, the university hosted a formal groundbreaking ceremony at the stadium site featuring longtime Houston Rockets commentator and alumnus Bill Worrell with President Renu Khator, athletics director Mack Rhoades, and chairwoman Nelda Luce Blair.

The official seating chart for the new stadium was released on July 19, 2013. In an effort to allow for fans to remain connected to the internet via their mobile devices while at the stadium, in April 2014, it was announced that Boingo Wireless would install, manage, and operate a distributed antenna system thereby enhancing cellular connections.  In addition, the company would deploy multiple Wi-Fi networks across the stadium that would be accessible by fans, and support other information systems as well as staff.

In November 2014, The Daily Cougar student newspaper published an article stating that construction on TDECU Stadium is not yet completed, and the stadium is $16 million over budget.  Subsequently, the Daily Cougar reported that the cost of the stadium is as much as $128 million, and that an audit was being conducted about whether state funds were used appropriately.

Awards
In 2015, TDECU Stadium received several accolades for its design and construction.   The Houston Business Journal named the stadium its Landmark Award winner in the "Public Assembly" category.  The annual Landmark Awards recognize real estate projects that make a significant impression on the Houston landscape and improve the look, feel and image of the city. In addition, TDECU Stadium claimed top honors in the "Commercial Built" category by the Austin chapter of the American Institute of Architects (AIA). The annual AIA Austin Design Awards program showcases excellence in design produced by AIA Austin members as selected by a panel of distinguished jurors. TDECU Stadium added a third design award to its distinguished resume as the facility received top honors in the AIA Houston chapter's over  category. Finally, the stadium won the 2015 Merit Award from the AIA Nebraska chapter.  The AIA Nebraska jury commented, "Wonderful example of doing more with less. The jury appreciated the overall straightforwardness of the design.”

Access

Transportation
TDECU Stadium is accessible via multiple modes of transportation. Houston METRORail's Southeast Line provides light rail access to the venue with a station less than 100 yards from the Southwest entrance of the stadium.  In the future, the stadium will also be accessible by the University Line.  While the University Line is still in planning stages, construction on the Southeast Line is complete and the line became operational several months before the 2015 season.  Built at a cost in excess of $800 million, the Southeast Line connects the Houston Theater District to the Astros' Minute Maid Park, the Dynamo's BBVA Stadium, the Cougars' new TDECU Stadium, and beyond to MacGregor Park.

TDECU Stadium is located between multiple roadways in a central area of Houston and within a mile of Interstate 45. The stadium is also accessible via several lines of the Metropolitan Transit Authority of Harris County. Taxis, Uber, and cycle rickshaws continue to service the stadium.

Parking
There are a total of 3,382 parking spaces adjacent to TDECU stadium after the loss of 353 spaces due to the indoor practice facility.  The $26 million stadium garage, which opened in 2012, provides 2,268 spots.  In addition, there are 1,114 surface spots in the immediate vicinity of the stadium.  There are thousands of additional parking places in satellite lots and other parking garages around campus.

Features

Bert F. Winston Band and Performance Center
The family of former marching band member Bert Winston made a generous donation to build a new home for the Cougar "Spirit of Houston" marching band in his honor.  A  building on the east end of the TDECU Stadium provides three recital halls of varying sizes in addition to classroom and storage space. The Spirit of Houston enters the east stadium concourse directly from the Winston Center, and sets up in the student section of the East lower bowl.

Skyline view

TDECU Stadium was designed to showcase the Houston skyline in the northwest corner of the stadium to remind all visitors and television audiences that UH is Houston's university. After a sun study, the orientation of the field was turned more east–west than the former Robertson Stadium. In addition to creating more efficient parking and fitting the stadium in line with the University's grid system campus layout, the change in orientation provided the skyline view to the south side of the stadium including the stadium club, suites and press box.  Finally, while the lower seating bowl encircles the playing field, a gap in the upper levels of seating was left open in the northwest corner of the stadium to highlight the skyline view. After construction of the indoor practice facility in 2017, fans in the South upper grandstand (300 level - see picture to the right) retained their skyline view.  However, the indoor practice facility occludes the skyline view for fans sitting in the suite level and club level below.

Legends Plaza
 TDECU Stadium contains a plaza area outside the northeast entrance recognizing the historical significance of Houston Cougar football, including a statue of College Football Hall of Fame Coach Bill Yeoman. Coach Yeoman not only invented the triple option Veer offense which revolutionized college and high school football, he led the Cougars to four Southwest Conference (SWC) titles, two Cotton Bowl victories and 11 Top 20 finishes in the AP Poll while helping to pioneer the integration of college football in Texas in the 1960s.  In addition to the Yeoman statue, Legends Plaza contains displays commemorating the accomplishments of Heisman Trophy winner Andre Ware and Lombardi Award winner Wilson Whitley, as well as a bronze Cougar donated by the Brezina family who had six brothers and a grandson play football for UH throughout the decades.

Yeoman Red and White Hall
Named for Hall of Fame Houston coach Bill Yeoman, the Yeoman Red and White Hall is a  tribute area to University of Houston history located on the northeast corner of TDECU Stadium.  It serves as a gameday club for ticket holders in Section 129 and the north side loge boxes.

Doris Nantz Press Box
The Doris Nantz Press Box, named for the mother of Cougar golf alumnus and CBS sportscaster Jim Nantz, contains seats for 70 working media along with a press dining area. Post-game press conferences take place in a wired field-level photographer work room.

John O'Quinn Field
The Cougars, who pioneered the football use of Astroturf in 1966, return to an artificial surface after playing on natural grass at Robertson Stadium since 1995.  The playing field is named for late UH benefactor John O'Quinn whose estate donated $5M for stadium construction.  O'Quinn gave millions to UH over the years, including the lead donation to renovate and expand Robertston Stadium in the late 1990s.

Houston installed Act Global UBU Speed Series S5-M turf at TDECU Stadium.  The 2013 and 2014 Super Bowls were played on UBU Speed Series S5-M turf.  The Cougars installed the same surface last year on one of their practice fields, joining the Houston Texans and several other NFL franchises who practice on UBU Speed Series S5-M.

The playing field itself  is uniquely marked.  The eleven yard line commemorates Heisman winner Andre Ware's retired jersey number.  The endzones are red with white lettering, and are accented with shadows of the Houston skyline and the Cougar mascot. Specifically, the west endzone (where the "gap" in the stadium allows spectators to view the Houston skyline) is labeled "Houston" and contains a silhouette of the skyline.  The east endzone (where the students and band sit) is labeled "Cougars" and contains a silhouette of the Cougar mascot.

Seating and scoreboard

With 26 suites, 42 loge boxes, 766 club seats, two suite decks, four party plazas and the Section 129 club, TDECU Stadium offers a variety of premium seating throughout the venue. In addition to the sections listed above, there are 3,778 chairback seats and 1,210 benchback seats.  The remaining 34,000 seats are traditional benches.

Unlike many college stadiums with premium seating at the top of the upper grandstand, UH built its  stadium club at ground level. The padded club level seats are located in the south lower seating bowl with the loge boxes on the concourse level, while the suites are located one floor above the club. Through a  glass wall, the club level patrons will enjoy an exclusive view of the team as they travel between their locker room and the tunnel accessing the field.

The new scoreboard measures 68' by 51' with an LED HD video display 68' wide by 38' tall. The video board, designed by Panasonic using Nichia technology, is among the 35 largest in college football, and among the 20 largest in terms of square feet per seating capacity.  Houston also installed ribbon scoreboards between the 20 yard lines on each side of the stadium as well as an auxiliary scoreboard in the southeast corner of the stadium.

On the February 23, 2017, the Board of Regents granted authority to the Chancellor to extend UH's contract with IMG Sports.  Part of the contract extension calls for IMG to pay $2.5 million for additional LED ribbon boards at TDECU Stadium. Athletic Director Hunter Yurachek told the Regents that ribbon boards will now encircle the entire field.

Additionally, UH announced in January 2017 that it will install 1,000 new chairback seats in Sections 127 and 131 for the 2017 season, replacing the original bench seating.

Cougar Cage
The upper stadium bowl exterior skin is a combination of red powder-coated corrugated metal and aluminum panels providing long-term durability with minimal maintenance.  Goals behind the design of the exterior skin included allowing natural light into the concourse while still protecting fans from the elements, and assuring ample air flow throughout the concourse and stadium for fan comfort without hindering the performance of student athletes.

Adjacent Indoor Practice Facility

On August 25, 2016, the University of Houston System Board of Regents authorized the design and construction of an indoor practice facility. The structure houses a temperature-controlled indoor practice facility with a full-size synthetic turf field and an auxiliary area dedicated for a future buildout of a football-only weight room.  Construction on the $20 million facility began following the 2016 season and was completed in the fall of 2017.  The facility is located near the northwest corner of the stadium, next to the stadium parking garage.

Future expansion
While the stadium seats 40,000, it was designed for potential future capacity of 60,000 seats. This includes the strategic placement and installation of foundations in the original construction phase to accommodate future expansion. Approximately 10,000 seats can be added to the north sideline upper grandstand, and another 10,000 seats can be added with upper end zone grandstands.

Tailgating
On game days, the University of Houston closes Cullen Boulevard from Holman Street to Cougar Place dormitory for the purpose of tailgating.  Students groups set up tents on Cullen and the stadium grounds as a part of the "Shasta Square" tailgate just east of the stadium, while the University of Houston Alumni Organization hosts "Party on the Plaza" next to the students.

RVs, which formerly parked in the lot on which the Indoor Practice Facility was built, now tailgate in lot 16B off Elgin near the Hines School of Architecture and Blaffer Art Museum.  Finally, fans tailgate in the various surface parking lots and adjoining green space across campus.

Home field advantage and attendance
Houston won sixteen straight football games at TDECU Stadium from 2014 to 2017, including four wins over ranked opponents.  This was the longest active home winning streak in the nation at the time. The 2015 Houston Cougar football team finished a perfect  at home, and the 2016 team went undefeated in six home games.  Overall, Houston's record at TDECU Stadium is now , including  against ranked teams.

Year by year

Note: Average crowd sizes do not include games played at NRG Stadium.

Top 20 TDECU Stadium Crowds
Rankings are from the AP Poll released prior to the game.

Milestones & Notable Games

Other events
In addition to major college football, TDECU Stadium hosts several high school football games each year, both regular season and playoffs.  The University of Houston holds commencement exercises at TDECU Stadium each May.  In 2015, actor Matthew McConaughey (whose father played college football at UH) gave the keynote address. Astronaut Scott Kelly delivered the 2016 address, while Arnold Schwarzenegger gave the 2017 commencement.

Additionally, until 2017, UH students celebrated Frontier Fiesta each Spring at TDECU Stadium and surrounding parking lots.  Frontier Fiesta is the University of Houston's oldest and proudest tradition. Established in 1940, it began as a festival to promote UH when the university first moved from downtown Houston to its present location. With the construction of the new indoor practice facility, this tradition was moved across campus to the parking lot next to the East Parking Garage.

See also

 List of NCAA Division I FBS football stadiums

References

External links

Texas Dow Employees Credit Union TDECU stadium page
2017 TDECU Stadium Seating Chart
Page Architect's TDECU Stadium page

Houston Cougars football venues
Houston Roughnecks
American football venues in Houston
College football venues
2014 establishments in Texas
Sports venues completed in 2014
XFL (2020) venues